Rain is a live album by contemporary worship band Planetshakers, recorded during the annual Planetshakers Conference in Melbourne, the Philippines, and Malaysia. Planetshakers Ministries International and Venture3Media released the album on 6 September 2019. The album also includes all the songs from Rain, Part 1 (released in January), Rain, Part 2 (released in April) and Rain, Part 3 (released in August). They worked with Joth Hunt in the production of this album.

Critical reception

Marc Daniel Rivera, specifying in a four star review for Kristiya Know, replies, "Overall, Rain does not disappoint. While the majority of the tracks tend to sound a little bit generic, the entire album is very singable and congregation-friendly. The artistry and collective effort behind this project are wonderfully manifested throughout the album. Above all, Rain represents the heartbeat and cry of a generation longing for more of God."

Track listing

Singles

References

2019 live albums
Planetshakers albums